The elm cultivar Ulmus × hollandica 'Balder' is one of five miniature or bonsai cultivars from the Elegantissima Group raised by the Gartneriet Vestdal nursery in Odense, Denmark.

Description
'Balder' is the closest of the five in resemblance to the parent × elegantissima.

Nurseries

Europe
Gartneriet Vestdal , Odense, Denmark.

Dutch elm cultivar
Ulmus articles missing images
Ulmus